Permatang Damar Laut is a coastal village within the city of George Town in the Malaysian state of Penang. It is located within the Southwest Penang Island District, at the southern tip of Penang Island, making it the southernmost human settlement on the island. The village is hemmed in between the Penang International Airport to the north and the Malacca Strait to the south.

Etymology 
The Malay word 'Permatang' refers to the village's geographic landform, as it is situated on a ridge surrounded by mangrove swamps. 'Damar' in Malay means resin whilst 'Laut' is the Malay word for the sea; the village was purportedly where resin-producing trees once grew along the shore, hence the phrase 'Damar Laut'.

History 
According to historians in Universiti Sains Malaysia, the village of Permatang Damar Laut was founded in the late 18th century by three pioneers of Indonesian origin - Pah Kechil, Jamaluddin and Nakhoda Che Salleh. The village was one of the handful of autonomous Malay settlements that were established at the south of Penang Island at the time.

Transportation 
The main road within Permatang Damar Laut is Jalan Permatang Damar Laut, which forms part of the Federal Route 6. The thoroughfare cuts through the village, linking it with Batu Maung to the east and the old town of Bayan Lepas to the west. Permatang Damar Laut is also the southern terminus of Rapid Penang's bus route 302, which connects the village with several destinations along the eastern half of Penang Island, such as Batu Maung, Bayan Lepas, Bayan Baru, SPICE Arena and the capital city of George Town.

To alleviate worsening traffic congestion in the area, the Malaysian Public Works Department has widened a stretch of the road leading to the village in 2017. The project also included the construction of a flyover and an elevated U-turn.

Education 
Permatang Damar Laut is served by a single primary school - SRK Permatang Damar Laut.

Health care 
The village contains a haemodialysis centre operated by the Penang Fo Yi Haemodialysis Society. Opened in 2017, the Fo Yi Medicare Centre is equipped with 30 dialysis machines, which allow it to treat 180 kidney patients per month.

See also 

 Teluk Tempoyak
 Batu Maung

References

Southwest Penang Island District
Villages in Penang